Iceland participated in the Eurovision Song Contest 2003 with the song "Open Your Heart" written by Sveinbjörn I. Baldvinsson, Birgitta Haukdal and Hallgrímur Óskarsson. The song was performed by Birgitta Haukdal. The Icelandic broadcaster Ríkisútvarpið (RÚV) returned to the Eurovision Song Contest after a one-year absence following their withdrawal in 2002 as one of the bottom six countries in the 2001 contest. The Icelandic entry for the 2003 contest in Riga, Latvia was selected through the national final Söngvakeppni Sjónvarpsins 2003, organised by RÚV. Fifteen songs competed in the selection which was held on 15 February 2003. "Segðu mér allt" performed by Birgitta Haukdal emerged as the winner exclusively through public televoting. The song was later translated from Icelandic to English for the Eurovision Song Contest and was titled "Open Your Heart".

Iceland competed in the Eurovision Song Contest which took place on 24 May 2003. Performing  as the opening entry for the show in position 1, Iceland placed eighth out of the 26 participating countries, scoring 81 points.

Background 

Prior to the 2003 Contest, Iceland had participated in the Eurovision Song Contest fifteen times since its first entry in 1986. Iceland's best placing in the contest to this point was second, which it achieved in 1999 with the song "All Out of Luck" performed by Selma. In 2001, Iceland placed twenty-second (joint last) with the song "Angel" performed by Two Tricky.

The Icelandic national broadcaster, Ríkisútvarpið (RÚV), broadcasts the event within Iceland and organises the selection process for the nation's entry. RÚV confirmed their intentions to participate at the 2003 Eurovision Song Contest on 17 October 2002. Since 2000, Iceland has used a national final to select their entry for the Eurovision Song Contest, a method that continued for their 2003 participation.

Before Eurovision

Söngvakeppni Sjónvarpsins 2003 
Söngvakeppni Sjónvarpsins 2003 was the national final format developed by RÚV in order to select Iceland's entry for the Eurovision Song Contest 2003. The competition was hosted by Logi Bergmann Eiðsson and Gísli Marteinn Baldursson and took place at the Háskólabíó venue in Reykjavík. The show was broadcast on RÚV and via radio on Rás 2.

Competing entries 
On 17 October 2002, RÚV opened the submission period for interested songwriters to submit their entries until the deadline on 18 November 2002. Songwriters were required to be Icelandic, possess Icelandic citizenship or have permanent residency in Iceland, and were required to submit entries in Icelandic with the winning composers being able to later decide the language that will be performed at the Eurovision Song Contest in Riga. At the close of the submission deadline, 204 entries were received. A selection committee was formed in order to select the top fifteen entries. The fifteen competing artists and songs were revealed by the broadcaster on 17 January 2003. RÚV presented the songs between 3 and 7 February 2003 during special programmes broadcast on RÚV.

Final 
The final took place on 15 February 2003 where fifteen entries competed. The winner, "Segðu mér allt" performed by Birgitta Haukdal, was determined solely by televoting.

At Eurovision 
According to Eurovision rules, all nations with the exceptions of the bottom ten countries in the 2002 contest competed in the final on 24 May 2003. On 29 November 2002, a special allocation draw was held which determined the running order and Iceland was set to open the show and perform in position 1, before the entry from Austria. Iceland finished in eighth place with 81 points.

The show was broadcast in Iceland on RÚV with commentary by Gísli Marteinn Baldursson. The Icelandic spokesperson, who announced the Icelandic votes during the show, was Eva María Jónsdóttir.

Voting 
Below is a breakdown of points awarded to Iceland and awarded by Iceland in the contest. The nation awarded its 12 points to Norway in the contest.

References 

2003
Countries in the Eurovision Song Contest 2003
Eurovision